Leeds railway station (also known as Leeds City railway station) is the mainline railway station serving the city centre of Leeds in West Yorkshire, England. It is the fourth-busiest railway station in the UK outside London (as of March 2020). It is located on New Station Street to the south of City Square, at the foot of Park Row, behind the landmark Queens Hotel. It is one of 20 stations managed by Network Rail.

Leeds is an important hub on the British rail network. The station is the terminus of the Leeds branch of the East Coast Main Line (on which London North Eastern Railway provides high speed inter-city services to  every half hour from the station) and is an important stop on the Cross Country Route between Scotland, the Midlands and South West England connecting to major cities such as Birmingham, Glasgow, Edinburgh, Derby, Bristol, Exeter, Plymouth and Penzance. There are also regular inter-city services to major destinations throughout Northern England including Manchester, Liverpool, Newcastle and Sheffield. It is also the terminus for trains running on the scenic Settle & Carlisle line. Future expansion might link the station to the proposed High Speed 2 network.

Leeds is a major hub for local and regional destinations across Yorkshire such as to Harrogate, York, Scarborough, Hull, Doncaster and Sheffield. The station lies at the heart of the West Yorkshire Metro commuter network for West Yorkshire providing services to Bradford, Wakefield, Dewsbury, Huddersfield and Halifax.

With over 31 million passenger entries and exits between April 2019 and March 2020, Leeds is the second busiest railway station in the North of England after  and the fourth-busiest railway station in the United Kingdom outside London, after ,  and Manchester Piccadilly.

Description

The railway station is situated on a hill falling from the south of the city to the River Aire and the Leeds & Liverpool Canal basin. Much of it is supported on Victorian brick-vaulted arches situated just off Neville Street which contain a centre consisting of cafés, restaurants, shops and exhibition spaces called Granary Wharf, known locally as the Dark Arches.

The railway station has 18 platforms, making it the largest by number of platforms in England outside London. There are 12 terminus and six through platforms. Most platforms are subdivided into up to four sections, i.e. 1a, 1b, 1c etc. Altogether, including the numbers, there are 47 platforms. Retail facilities in the station include coffee shops, fast food outlets, a bar, newsagents, chemists and supermarkets. A British Transport Police station on New Station Street houses officers who police the West Yorkshire railway stations.

Leeds railway station retained staffed ticket barriers through the 1990s until 2008, when they were replaced by automatic barriers by Northern Rail to reduce congestion around the barriers at peak times.

Platforms
Platform usage varies depending on operational circumstances but is generally:
 6 is a bay platform used for terminating London North Eastern Railway services from London.
 8, 9, 11, 12, 15, 16 – through platforms. 8 is a through platform that London North Eastern Railway uses for services which both terminate and continue onward to Bradford, Harrogate and Skipton as well as the early morning LNER departure to Aberdeen. CrossCountry services heading north to York and beyond depart from platforms 8, 9 or 11; services heading south use platform 12. Platforms 15 and 16 are used by north/east and south/westbound TransPennine Express services to Hull, Newcastle, York, Scarborough, Middlesbrough, Huddersfield, Manchester Airport and Liverpool Lime Street.
 7, 14 – bay platforms used for local Northern services running north/east from Leeds.
 10, 13, 17 – bay platforms used for local and regional services running south/west to Manchester Victoria and Huddersfield, alongside southbound services towards Wakefield, Barnsley, Meadowhall, Sheffield and Nottingham.

Transport links

Leeds Interchange, located at the New Station Street exit, provides onward transport connections from the station. There are five bus stands serving Arriva Yorkshire, First West Yorkshire and Flyer routes 1, 4, 4F, 5, 14, 16, 16A, 19, 19A, 40, 444, 446, 870, A1 and DalesBus services 874 and 875. A 24-hour taxi rank also operates at the interchange.

Further bus stops are located on Neville Street below the railway station, as well as around City Square outside the railway station. Infirmary Street and Boar Lane bus points are a short walk for more bus connections.

Cycle hub
Leeds Interchange hosts one of the UK's first cycle hubs that allows a number of cycling services including repair, storage and rental. The facility opened in summer 2010 and is designed to encourage visitors and commuters into Leeds to continue their journey from the railway station by bike. Its design is based on the Dutch cyclepoint concept.

History

Past railway stations

The railways arrived in Leeds in 1834, when the Leeds and Selby Railway (which became part of the North Eastern Railway) opened its line. It had a terminus at Marsh Lane east of the city centre. In 1840, the North Midland Railway (a constituent of the Midland Railway) constructed its line from Derby via Rotherham to a terminus at Hunslet Lane to the south. It was extended to a more centrally located terminus at Wellington Street in 1846, known as Wellington Station.

Another railway station, Leeds Central on Wellington Street, was opened in 1854 by the Manchester & Leeds Railway and the London & North Western Railway (LNWR). The railway station became owned jointly by the LNWR and the North Eastern Railway, but other companies had powers to run trains there, including the Great Northern Railway and the Lancashire & Yorkshire Railway.

In 1869, New Station opened as a joint enterprise by the LNWR and the North Eastern Railway. It connected the former Leeds and Selby Railway Line to the east with the LNWR lines to the west. A mile-long connection was built, carried entirely on viaducts and bridges. New Station was built partially on a bridge over the River Aire, adjacent to Wellington railway station. The arches created under the station are known as 'The Dark Arches'.

The map to the right shows the variety of different railway lines in Leeds in 1913.
Following the 1921 Railways Act, when railways in Great Britain were grouped into four companies, New Station was jointly operated by the London, Midland & Scottish Railway (LMS) and the London & North Eastern Railway (LNER).

1938 rebuilding

The first rationalisation occurred in 1938, when two railway stations (New and Wellington) were combined to form Leeds City Station, opening on 2 May that year. This was designed by LMS architect William Henry Hamlyn. The third railway station, Leeds Central, was unaffected by the change. Part of Wellington railway station later became a parcels depot. The north concourse and the Queens Hotel were built at this time.

Leeds Blitz

In March 1941, the Luftwaffe launched attacks on Leeds, Armley, Beeston and Bramley. Leeds New Station was one of the primary targets, along with the Town Hall, Kirkgate Markets, the Central Post office, the Quarry Hill flats, Hotel Metropole and part of the Inner Ring Road. The station was bombed, causing an unknown number of casualties, and was later rebuilt.

The Transport Act 1947 nationalised nearly all forms of mass transport in Great Britain and came into effect on 1 January 1948. British Railways came into existence as the business name of the Railway Executive of the British Transport Commission (BTC) on 1 January 1948.

1962 British Railways House

In 1962, British Railways House, now City House, was added to the railway station. It was designed by architect John Poulson providing British Railways with administrative buildings. The building became dated and hard to let before refurbishment in 2009. The building was lambasted in 1967 by poet John Betjeman who said it blocked all the light out of City Square, and was a testament to money with no architectural merit. In 2010 the building was bought by property company Bruntwood which is (as of 2017) redeveloping it to provide serviced offices, with a new look to the façade.

1967 rebuilding
In 1967, further remodelling of the site took place and trains using Central Railway Station were diverted into the City Railway Station which became the main railway station serving the city. Central Railway Station was closed and has been demolished. The viaduct leading to Central Railway Station is one of many disused viaducts near Leeds Railway Station.  Engineering work included replacing 100-year-old bridges over the Leeds and Liverpool Canal, the construction of the south concourse and an overall roof, along with major platform and track layout alterations and the commissioning of a new power signal box to control the railway station area.

At the time of this rebuilding, the railway station was served by 500 trains on a typical day, with 2.75 million passenger journeys a year. Wellington (or City North) became entirely devoted to parcels traffic at this time with the track layout extensively changed. The remaining Midland line trains which previously used City North station were diverted into the City South station, the former LNWR/NER 'New' station, and called simply Leeds from this time.

Electrification
The station had overhead electrification installed under the ownership of British Rail in 1988, to facilitate usage of the new Class 91 services on the East Coast main line.

2002 rebuilding

By the 1990s, the railway station's capacity was exceeded on a daily basis, and the 1967 design was deemed inadequate. Between 1999 and 2002, a major rebuilding project took place, branded as Leeds 1st. This project saw the construction of additional approach tracks at the western end of the railway station, improving efficiency by separating trains travelling to or from different destinations and preventing them from having to cross each other's routes. The railway station was expanded from 12 to 17 platforms, with the construction of new platforms on the south side, and reopening of the disused parcels depot to passengers on the north side.

The most visible change to passengers, however, was the replacement of the 1967 metal canopy with a new glass roof, considerably increasing the amount of daylight on the platforms. A new footbridge was also provided, replacing the previous underpass. Ancillary improvements included a new multi-storey car park and railway station entrance, refurbishing the North Concourse and expanding retail facilities.

A small temporary railway station called Leeds Whitehall was provided to handle some services while the railway station was being remodelled. This was used between September 1999 and February 2002.

2008 work
In 2008, automated ticket gates were installed in place of the human-controlled ticket checking, to speed up the passage of passengers. When the gates came into operation at the end of October 2008, they suffered from several faults including accepting expired tickets. An oversight on the part of Northern also meant that the gates were not compatible with West Yorkshire Metro Cards.

Southern entrance
A £17.3 million southern entrance to allow for easier access from the south completed on 3 January 2016. It widens the railway station's western footbridge and provides escalators, stairs and lifts to a partial deck over the River Aire in an iconic structure. The deck provides access to either side of the river for passengers to access Granary Wharf and Little Neville Street or Holbeck. It contains extra ticket vending machines and cycle storage. Around 20% of passengers are expected to use the new entrance.

South concourse and platform zero
Work on a new terminal platform alongside platform 1 (labelled platform 0) began in late 2018 and was completed in January 2021.

In November 2018 Network Rail began work to improve the south concourse. The first phase of works aimed to reduce congestion by moving and expanding ticket barriers. A new transparent roof was installed, matching the design at the Southern entrance, with works completed in October 2019.

Accidents and incidents
13 January 1892, a fire broke out in the arches underneath the station carrying the River Aire and the Leeds and Liverpool Canal. The fire burnt for two days, with the heat buckling the rails and causing significant damage to the permanent way. One person died when a platform collapsed underneath him.
On 23 July 1993, a passenger train ran into the rear of another occupying a platform. Twenty-one people were injured.
On 17 April 1997 a small bomb planted by the Provisional Irish Republican Army exploded at a relay cabinet near the station, causing the city centre's closure for six hours.

Future

Leeds City railway station is the third-busiest railway station outside London in England; being a very busy railway station, expansion is needed. Passenger numbers at Leeds are expected to surge by 63% by 2029, meaning further expansion is necessary.

Future Remodelling
In October 2017, it was proposed that the station could be remodelled for the proposed HS2 scheme. The proposal includes new platforms on the northside of Leeds as well as HS2 services running into the existing east–west platforms as well as the proposed terminal platforms allowing links to proposed 'Northern Powerhouse Rail'. In November 2017, details were released about how the station might look.

Expansion
Plans are being drawn up to expand the railway station's capacity with new lines and platforms alongside platform one in the Riverside Car Park on the site of the original Leeds Wellington railway station to cater for predicted growth. Also Metro announced plans to replace platform 1 with three separate platforms using the car park next to it. This would increase platform numbers from 17 to 20.

HS2 platforms

The original plans for High Speed 2 proposed a separate new station in Leeds to the south of the River Aire at New Lane. However, a later review in November 2015 instead recommends that HS2 platforms be added to the existing station. These would attach to the southern part of the existing station building, and span the river in a north–south alignment to create a 'T' shape.

Whilst not directly linking the rail lines, it will allow a common concourse for easy interchange between high speed and classic rail services.  These plans were approved by the Government in November 2016.

However, on 18 November 2021, Grant Shapps (Transport Secretary) announced that the eastern leg of HS2 would be cancelled, terminating at East Midlands Parkway instead of going all the way to Leeds.

Services

The railway station is served by long-distance services operated by CrossCountry, London North Eastern Railway and TransPennine Express, and local and regional services operated by Northern. It is the hub of the Metro network in West Yorkshire. The typical off-peak service in trains per hour (tph) and trains per day (tpd) is

London North Eastern Railway
 2 tph to 
 1 train every 2 hours to 
 2 tpd to 
 1 tpd to 
 1 tpd to 

CrossCountry

TransPennine Express
 1 tph to 
 1 tph to  via 
 1 tph to 
 2 tph to  via 
 1 tph to 
 1 tph to 

Northern Trains
 2 tph to 
 1 train every 2 hours to 
 3 tph to Manchester via the Calder Valley line:
 1 train every 2 hours to 
 3 tph to  via the Hallam line:
 1 tph to  via 
 1 tph to 
 2 tph to : 
 1 tph via , with 1 tpd continuing to 
 1 tph via 
 1 train every 2 hours to 
 2 tph to  via  (one fast, one stopping)
 2 tph to  via

Former services
East Midlands Railway (EMR) and its predecessors operated a number of services to and from London St Pancras via the Midland Main Line until May 2022. Two evening northbound and two morning southbound services operated primarily to cycle InterCity 125 sets through Neville Hill TMD. After EMR withdrew its last InterCity 125 sets in May 2021, the service was reduced to a single northbound service operated by a Class 222. It was withdrawn in May 2022.

See also
Listed buildings in Leeds (City and Hunslet Ward - northern area)

References

Further reading

External links

https://web.archive.org/web/20160805024619/http://www.networkrail.co.uk/virtualarchive/leeds-station/ – history of the station from Network Rail archives

Art Deco architecture in Leeds
Art Deco railway stations
Articles containing video clips
DfT Category A stations
Former London, Midland and Scottish Railway stations 
Former London and North Eastern Railway stations 
Network Rail managed stations
Railway stations in Leeds
Railway stations in Great Britain opened in 1938
Railway stations served by CrossCountry
Railway stations served by London North Eastern Railway
Northern franchise railway stations
Railway stations served by TransPennine Express
Union stations in the United Kingdom
1869 establishments in England